Ahmad Riza Patria (born 17 December 1969) is an Indonesian politician who served as the 15th Vice Governor of Jakarta from 2020 to 2022. He previously served as a Vice Chairman of Second Commission in the People's Representative Council of Indonesia. He was elected in the seat of West Java V constituency winning with a total vote of 23,991 in the 2014 legislative elections.

Career 

In 2012, Patria was the running mate of Hendardji Supandji as Deputy Governor during the Jakarta gubernatorial elections in 2012. Previously he was the chairman of the National Youth Council in Indonesia from 1999 to 2002. In 2002, he was re-elected to serve as chairman of the KNPI in Jakarta. Ahmad Patria is a graduate from the ISTN - National Institute of Science and Technology.

In 2018, Patria was appointed the Spokesperson for presidential candidate Prabowo Subianto Djojohadikusumo. He is also the current Chairman of Gerindra Party central board.

On 6 April 2020, Patria was voted to take on the role of the once vacant Deputy Governor of DKI Jakarta, after winning the vote in the Jakarta DPRD with 81 out of 100 cast votes.

Personal life 
On 29 November 2020, Patria was confirmed positive for COVID-19.

References 

1969 births
Living people
Banjar people
People from South Kalimantan
People from Banjarmasin
Great Indonesia Movement Party politicians
Vice Governors of Jakarta
Members of the People's Representative Council, 2019
Members of the People's Representative Council, 2014